The swimming competitions at the 2019 Pan American Games in Lima will take place from 6 to 10 August at the Aquatic Centre. The open-water marathon will be held on August 4 in Laguna Bujama.

Events
Similar to the program's format in 2015, swimming features a total of 36 events (17 each for men and women and 2 mixed), including two 10 km open-water marathons. The following events will be contested (all pool events are long course, and distances are in metres unless stated):
Freestyle: 50, 100, 200, 400, 800, and 1,500;
Backstroke: 100 and 200;
Breaststroke: 100 and 200;
Butterfly: 100 and 200;
Individual medley: 200 and 400;
Relays: 4×100 free (including mixed), 4×200 free, 4×100 medley (including mixed)
Marathon: 10 kilometres

Schedule
All times are Peru Time (UTC-5)

Medal summary

Medal table

Medalists

Men's events

 Swimmers who participated in the heats only and received medals.

Women's events

 Swimmers who participated in the heats only and received medals.

Mixed

Qualification

A total of 350 swimmers will qualify in the pool and a total of 40 additional open water swimmers will qualify as well. As Host Country, Peru automatically will qualify 18 male and 18 female competitors in the pool. Each National Olympic Committee (NOC) may use proven swim times attained during the qualification
period of those swimmers who have met the qualifying standards established by the UANA for the 2019 Pan American Games at a competition recognized by the FINA from the official list of approved qualifying competitions for the 18th FINA World Aquatics Championships held in Gwangju, Korea. Each event (besides the relays) have an A standard (two entries allowed) or a B standard (one entry allowed). Countries not qualified can enter one male and one female swimmer through the universality rule. In open water, Canada and the USA automatically qualify two per gender, with eight spots being awarded in each gender to CONSANAT and CCCAN.

Participation

Participating nations
Athletes from -- nations competed in swimming at the 2019 Pan American Games

See also
Swimming at the 2019 Parapan American Games
Swimming at the 2020 Summer Olympics

References

External links
Results book – Swimming
Results book – Open water swimming

 
Events at the 2019 Pan American Games
Pan American Games
Swimming
Pan American Games
2019